Carolle is a feminine given name. Notable people known by this name include the following:

Given name
Carolle Brabant, Canadian film executive
Carolle J. Carter, penname of Carolle J. Kitchens (born 1934), American historian
Carolle de Ste. Croix (born 1968), Canadian educator, researcher and political figure
Carolle Zahi (born 1994), French sprinter

Middle name
Robin Carolle Brantley, full name of Robin Robinson (born 1957), Chicago news anchor

See also

Carole
Carolee
Caroll
Carolla
Carollo
Fábio Carille